Oral storytelling is an ancient and intimate tradition between the storyteller and their audience. The storyteller and the listeners are physically close, often seated together in a circular fashion. The intimacy and connection is deepened by the flexibility of oral storytelling which allows the tale to be moulded according to the needs of the audience and the location or environment of the telling. Listeners also experience the urgency of a creative process taking place in their presence and they experience the empowerment of being a part of that creative process. Storytelling creates a personal bond with the teller and the audience.

The flexibility of oral storytelling extends to the teller as well. Each teller will incorporate their own personality and may choose to add characters into the story. As a result, there will be numerous variations of a single story. Some tellers consider anything outside the narrative as extraneous, while other storytellers choose to enhance their telling of the tale with the addition of visual and audio tools, specific actions and creative strategies and devices.

Storytelling may be performed in many forms: in prose, in poetic form, as a song, accompanied with dance or some kind of theatrical performance, etc.

Human need

It is likely that oral storytelling has been around as long as the human language. Storytelling fulfills the need for human beings to cast their experiences in narrative form.. This long tradition of storytelling is evident in ancient cultures such as the Australian Aboriginals. Community storytelling offered the security of explanation; how life and its many forms began and why things happen, as well as entertainment and enchantment. Communities were strengthened and maintained through stories that connected the present, the past and the future.

Telling stories is a nurturing act for the listener, who is connected to the storyteller through the story, as well as for the storyteller who is connected to the listeners through the story.

History

Early storytelling probably originates in simple chants . People sang chants as they worked at grinding corn or sharpening tools. Our early ancestors created myths to explain natural occurrences. They assigned superhuman qualities to ordinary people, thus originating the hero tale.

Early storytelling combined stories, poetry, music, and dance. Those who excelled at storytelling became entertainers, educators, cultural advisors, and historians for the community. Through storytellers, the history of a culture was handed down from generation to generation.

The importance of stories and storytellers throughout human history can be seen in the respect afforded to professional storytellers.

The 9th century fictional storyteller Scheherazade of One Thousand and One Nights, who saves herself from execution by telling tales, is one example  illustrating the value placed on storytelling in days of old. Centuries before Scheherazade, the power of storytelling is reflected by Vyasa at the beginning of the Indian epic Mahabharata. Vyasa says, "If you listen carefully, at the end you'll be someone else."

In the Middle Ages storytellers, also called a troubadour or a minstrel, could be seen in the market places and were honored as members of royal courts. Medieval storytellers were expected to know all the current tales and in the words of American storyteller Ruth Sawyer, ‘to repeat all the noteworthy theses from the universities, to be well informed on court scandal, to know the healing power of herbs and simples (medicines), to be able to compose verses to a lord or lady at a moment's notice, and to play on at least two of the instruments then in favor at court.’ According to some writers there were 426 minstrels employed at the wedding of Princess Margaret of England in 1290. Two of the storytellers of the court of  King Edward I were two women who performed under the names of Matill Makejoye and Pearl in the Egg.

Journeying from land to land, storytellers would learn various region's stories while also gathering news to bring back with them. Through exchanging stories with other storytellers, stories changed, making it difficult to trace the origins of many stories.

In the 1800s Jakob and Wilhelm Grimm collected and published stories that had been told orally in Germany. They did not publish them as they found them however, but edited them in accordance with their own values. Like the Grimm brothers in Germany, Peter Christen Asbjørnsen and Jorgen Moe collected Norwegian folk tales. In Denmark Hans Christian Andersen adapted folktales he heard from oral storytellers. In England, Joseph Jacobs recorded collections of folktales of England, Scotland, Wales.

In the 1900s the importance of oral storytelling was recognised by storytellers such as Marie Shedlock, a retired English schoolteacher. She made several tours to the United States to lecture on the art of storytelling emphasising the importance of storytelling as a natural way to introduce literature to children.

Professional storytellers in various cultures
Ashik/ashough, in Turkic cultures
Bard
Pingshu, Chinese culture
Dastangoi, India
Qissagoi, Pakistan and India
Fili & Seanchaí, Ireland
Goliard
Griot, West Africa
Gusans, of Parthia and Armenia of old times
Kobzar, Ukraine
Maggid(Hebrew) Jewish
Minstrel 
Dengbêj, Kurdish epic singer
, term predating âşık ("ashik") in Turkic cultures
Üligershin, Mongols, Buryats
Hakawati, Arab culture

Oral storytelling festivals

In the 20th century oral storytelling has undergone a revival of interest and focus.  Including the establishment of a number of storytelling festivals beginning with the  National Storytelling Festival (USA) in Jonesborough, TN.  

Regional storytelling festivals bring tellers of a certain state or region together for entertaining, telling and education in the art.

Films
 How People Got Fire - Animated film about oral storytelling in Native culture

References

 Jane Yolen; Favorite Folktales From Around the World.
 Stone, Packer & Hoopes (1983); The Short Story-An Introduction
 Carlson, Ann D. Storytelling. World Book Advanced. 2009

External links
 Tim Sheppard's Storytelling Resources

Oral literature
Oral tradition
Storytelling